(644?–668?) was royalty in Japan during the Asuka Period. She was the eldest daughter of Emperor Tenji. She was the elder sister of Princess Uno-Sarara. She was the mother of Princess Ōku and Prince Ōtsu. Her mother was Lady Ochi, whose father was Soga no Kurayamada-no-Ishikawamaro.

She was not in good health by nature. She died around 668 when Princess Ōku was seven years old and Prince Ōtsu five. Her body was buried on the 27th day of the second month in that year, together with Empress Saimei and Ōta's aunt, Empress Dowager Hashibito.

Japanese princesses
People of Asuka-period Japan
644 births
668 deaths
Year of birth uncertain
Year of death uncertain
Emperor Tenmu
7th-century Japanese people
7th-century Japanese women
Daughters of emperors